The 1989 World Orienteering Championships, the 13th World Orienteering Championships, were held in Skövde, Sweden, 17–20 August 1989.

The championships had four events; individual contests for men and women, and relays for men and women.

Medalists

References 

World Orienteering Championships
World Orienteering Championships
International sports competitions hosted by Sweden
World Orienteering Championships
Orienteering in Sweden
Sports competitions in Skövde